Mamudo Moro (born 7 March 1995) is a Ghanaian footballer who plays for Mjällby AIF.

References

1995 births
Living people
Ghanaian footballers
Association football midfielders
BW 90 IF players
IFK Hässleholm players
Mjällby AIF players
Helsingborgs IF players
Superettan players
Allsvenskan players
Ghanaian expatriate footballers
Expatriate footballers in Sweden
Ghanaian expatriate sportspeople in Sweden